Mariano Lukov (Bulgarian: Мариано Луков) (born 2 April 1958) is a Bulgarian former table tennis player.

Biography

He has been table tennis champion of Bulgaria on numerous occasions and also represented his country at the inaugural Olympics that featured the sport. Lukov's group stage record in Seoul was 3 wins and 4 losses, which did not allow him to advance to the knockout rounds. At the 1990 European Championships in Gothenburg Lukov finished in the top 16.

Following the end of his professional career, Lukov has been working as a player-coach and director of an international training center in Saint-Étienne.

References

Living people
1958 births
Bulgarian male table tennis players
Table tennis players at the 1988 Summer Olympics
People from Plovdiv Province
Olympic table tennis players of Bulgaria